Maria Bertoletti Toldini (1656 - 14 March 1716), was an Italian farmer's wife who was executed by burning in Brentonico after having been condemned for witchcraft. 

She was one of the last people to be executed for witchcraft in Northern Italy, as well as one of the last in the region to have been burned at the stake. 

She was one of the most well known victims of the witch hunt in the region. In 2015, she was rehabilitated by commune of Brentonico and declared innocent. It is believed that she was charged because of a inheritance conflicts within the family.

References

1716 deaths
People executed by Italy
18th-century executions
People executed for witchcraft
People executed by burning
Witch trials in Italy